Red Sun Rising is an American rock band from Akron, Ohio that is currently on hiatus. The band has released two studio albums through the Razor & Tie record label; their first, Polyester Zeal, in 2015, and their second, Thread, on March 30, 2018. The band also released an EP titled Peel on March 22, 2019.

History 

Red Sun Rising formed in 2006 when Mike Protich and Ryan Williams, who used to be high school classmates, struck up a conversation about music at a gas station. By 2007, Red Sun Rising's first line-up was formed and they were playing local gigs. In 2011, Tyler Valendza joined the group, bringing a new element to the group's sound.

They built a following by previewing their self-released albums over their social media websites and were touring nationally by 2013. In 2014, the band signed with Razor & Tie records and released their album Polyester Zeal in August 2015 which debuted at number 11 on the Billboard Hard Rock album chart. In 2015, Tyler Valendza left the band and was replaced by Dave McGarry, who was first announced as the new guitarist in a Facebook post.

Their singles "The Otherside" and "Emotionless" both reached number 1 on the Mainstream Rock chart, making them the first band since Trapt to reach number 1 twice on their first album. Their third single "Amnesia" peaked at number 6 on the same chart. The band often uses the hashtag #WeAreThread, which is said to be the name of the genre of music they would like to represent. They explain that their influences are like the threads in fabric and they feel they cannot truly be described as one particular genre. 

"Deathwish" was featured in the 2018 video game Forza Horizon 4 on its in-game rock radio station Horizon XS.

Red Sun Rising announced an indefinite hiatus on February 28, 2020. Ryan Williams went on to form 
((New Monarch))https://www.facebook.com/NewMonarchMusic The first single "The Fray" released May 28, 2021.  https://www.youtube.com/watch?v=DHgrJoIbQRg  Members Mike Protich, Dave McGarry, and Pat Gerasia formed a new band The Violent, releasing a music video for their single "Fly on the Wall" on May 22, 2020.

Band members 
Current members
 Ryan Williams – lead guitar (2006-present)
 Mike Protich – lead vocals, guitar (2007–present)
 Dave McGarry – rhythm guitar, backing vocals (2015–present)
 Ricky Miller – bass, backing vocals (2015–present)
 Pat Gerasia – drums, percussion (2015–present)

Former members

 Mark Jendrisak – drums (2009–2013)
 Hayes Hornish – bass, backing vocals (2007–2011)
 Mitch Bandel – bass, backing vocals (2011–2013)
 Mark Matthews – bass, backing vocals (2013–2015)
 Adam Mercer – drums, percussion (2013–2014)
 Tyler Valendza – rhythm guitar (2012–2015)
 Bobby Consiglio - drums, backing vocals   (2007-2008)

Discography

Studio albums

Independent albums

EPs 
The Fix (2012)
Into Forever (2013)
Peel (2019)

Singles

Promotional Singles

Music videos

References 

American hard rock musical groups
Musical groups established in 2007
Musical groups from Akron, Ohio
American post-grunge musical groups
Rock music groups from Ohio